Johnnies or Johnnys may refer to:


Sport
Huntington Johnnies, a former minor league baseball based in Huntington, Indiana
Johnstown Johnnies, a former minor league baseball team in Johnstown, Pennsylvania, US
Johnstown Johnnies (basketball), a former basketball team based in Johnstown, Pennsylvania, US

Music
 Johnnys, a Japanese boy band active from 1962 to 1967
 The Johnnys, an Australian pub rock band

Nicknames
 Johnnies, nickname of John Martin & Co., a former department store in Adelaide, Australia
 Johnnies, nickname of the men's college at College of Saint Benedict and Saint John's University, Minnesota, US

See also
 The 2 Johnnies, an Irish comedy duo
 Onion Johnnies, Breton farmers and agricultural labourers who sell onions door to door in Great Britain
 Stage Door Johnnies, gentlemen who waited at the stage door for the Edwardian chorus girls known as the Gaiety Girls, in London
 Stage Door Johnnies (album), 1974 album by Claire Hamill